Dariusz Biczysko (born 25 June 1962) is a Polish former athlete who specialised in the high jump. He won a bronze medal at the 1985 European Indoor Championships. In addition, he represented his country at the 1983 World Championships without qualifying for the final.

His personal bests in the event are 2.28 metres outdoors (Birmingham 1983) and 2.30 metres indoors (Piraeus 1985).

International competitions

References

1962 births
Living people
Polish male high jumpers
People from Zielona Góra
World Athletics Championships athletes for Poland